The third season of Brothers & Sisters consisted of  a full 24 episodes. The season premiered on ABC on September 28, 2008, and concluded May 10, 2009.

Cast

All principal cast members returned for the third season as well as Luke Macfarlane, who portrays Scotty Wandell, being upgraded to a main character after guest starring in seasons one and two. This season introduced new recurring characters Ryan Lafferty (Luke Grimes) revealed to be William Walker's love child, Trish Evans (Sonja Sohn) as Kitty and Robert's birth mother and Alec Tyler (Matt Letscher) a single dad who grows close to Kitty.

This season also saw the departure of Julia Walker (Sarah Jane Morris). Her final episode; entitled 'Julia', revolved around her character's decision to start a new life with her daughter Elizabeth after discovering Tommy's lies and illegal activities at Ojai.

Chad Berry; Kevin's ex-boyfriend (portrayed by Jason Lewis) will make a guest appearance after bumping into him in a bar. As will Sarah's ex-boyfriend/ business partner Graham Finch (Steven Weber) who will cross paths with the eldest Walker sibling as she tries to get her new business off the ground.

Main cast
Dave Annable as Justin Walker
Maxwell Perry Cotton as Cooper Whedon
Kerris Dorsey as Paige Whedon
Sally Field as Nora Walker
Calista Flockhart as Kitty Walker
Balthazar Getty as Tommy Walker
Rachel Griffiths as Sarah Walker
Rob Lowe as Robert McCallister
Luke Macfarlane as Scotty Wandell
Sarah Jane Morris as Julia Walker
Matthew Rhys as Kevin Walker
Ron Rifkin as Saul Holden
Emily VanCamp as Rebecca Harper
Patricia Wettig as Holly Harper

Recurring and notable guest stars
Luke Grimes as Ryan Lafferty
Nigel Havers as Roger Grant
Megan Follows as Maggie Stephens
Matt Letscher as Alec Tyler
Jason Lewis as Chad Barry (1 episode)
Will McCormack as Ethan Travis
Ken Olin as David Caplan
Eric Christian Olsen as Kyle DeWitt
Mitch Pileggi as Browne Carter
Tom Skerritt as William Walker
Sonja Sohn as Trish Evans
Steven Weber as Graham Finch
Cristián de la Fuente as Cal

Storylines
This season introduced Ryan Lafferty, the Walkers' half-brother, to the series as well as dealt with Holly's increasing presence at Ojai Foods. All the siblings also face serious problems within their relationships, while Rebecca searches for her new place within the family.

Nora
Although Nora is initially against finding Ryan, she later changes her mind and goes to meet Ryan and invites him to stay with her. However, it is made apparent later in the season that Ryan may have had ulterior motives for agreeing with Nora's request. He also causes problems between Justin and Rebecca after developing feelings for Rebecca and encouraging her distrust in Justin.

Nora also decides to start a nonprofit center for families of patients with illnesses and becomes attracted to her architect, Roger. The two begin to see each other; however, things become complicated when Nora discovers Roger is married, but he and his wife share an open relationship. After trying to feel comfortable in this modern relationship, Nora tells Roger that she can no longer be with him and that he should go back to his wife.

Sarah
Sarah is having trouble finding work as a single mother after leaving Ojai, while her decision to leave the family business has created uneasy feelings within the family, especially with Tommy. Eventually, she decides to risk putting her money into helping 'Greenatopia' a small internet business company which two young, recent college graduates run out of their apartment. After Tommy disappears and Ojai is put in jeopardy, Sarah eventually goes back to the family business and must learn to work alongside Holly. She also faces new problems as her daughter, Paige, begins to grow up.

Kitty & Robert
Kitty and Robert move forward in their decision to adopt a child, while at the same time Robert has secretly decided to run for governor. Kitty writes a tell-all book about her time in politics and working for Robert, and agrees that she can no longer work for him. Robert has a heart attack the same day their new son, Evan, is born, leaving Kitty to take care of them both and causing a rift in their marriage. Kitty becomes close to a single dad, Alec, whom she meets in the park. However, after a near car accident leaves Kitty and Alec with similar wounds, Robert realizes what is happening. He tells Alec to stay away from his wife and Kitty that she must make a choice. Although Kitty decides to stay with her husband, their relationship is strained for the rest of the season.

Kevin & Scotty
Kevin accepts a job offer from Robert as lawyer and press secretary after he was passed over for partner in the prestigious law firm he worked for. As well as trying to handle his new job, Kevin must adjust to married life with new husband Scotty, who frequently feels caught in the middle of troubles between Robert and his sister Kitty, whom he misleads at Robert's request.

Justin & Rebecca
Rebecca and Justin struggle to begin a romantic relationship, as they adjust from thinking they were family and as they try to keep the feud between their families from affecting them. Justin finally decides his path in life and applies to medical school. After a fight with Justin, Rebecca flies to New York and meets up with David. After spending some time together, David surprises Rebecca at the airport and tells her he has decided to join her on the same flight back to LA. Holly and David decide to get back together and be a family.

After a brief separation, Justin and Rebecca get back together and become engaged at the end of the season.

Tommy & Julia
After driving Sarah and Saul from Ojai, Tommy decides it's time to get rid of Holly but engages in an illegal transaction to do so. Once he is discovered, Tommy flees to avoid going to prison. After spending time waiting for him to return, Julia leaves with Elizabeth to start a new job in Seattle. The Walkers go to Mexico to find Tommy at the end of the season but he decides to stay as he's in a good place and helping people. The family says goodbye and leaves him in Mexico in the final moments of the season.

Episodes

Production
The show was created by Ken Olin and Jon Robin Baitz. Brothers & Sisters is produced by Berlanti Television, After Portsmouth, and Touchstone Television (Fall 2006-Spring 2007), which is now ABC Studios (Fall 2007–present).

Ratings
The third season ranked #33 this season, the highest position it has held yet. However, the average number of viewers dropped to around 10.6 million.

Season Three Weekly

References

2009 American television seasons
2008 American television seasons